The Fort Yuma Indian Reservation is a part of the traditional lands of the Quechan people. Both the county and city are named for the tribe. As of the 2010 Census the population was 2,189. In 1910, the community of Bard, California, was created after the eastern part of the reservation was declared surplus under the Dawes Act.

In 2009, the Quechan Tribe opened a large gaming resort, the Quechan Casino Resort, on their reservation land.

References

Quechan
American Indian reservations in Arizona
American Indian reservations in California
Federally recognized tribes in the United States
Yuma, Arizona
Winterhaven, California
Geography of Yuma County, Arizona
Geography of Imperial County, California
1884 establishments in Arizona Territory